This is a list of châteaux in the French region of Lorraine.

Meurthe-et-Moselle 

Château Anthoine in Vandœuvre-lès-Nancy
Château d'Adoménil in Rehainviller
Château de Bainville-aux-Miroirs in Bainville-aux-Miroirs
Maison-forte de Barisey in Barisey-au-Plain
Château de Blâmont in Blâmont
Maison-forte médiévale in Boucq
Château médiéval in Bouvron, Meurthe-et-Moselle
Château de Brabois in Villers-lès-Nancy
Château de Clémery in Clémery
Château de Cons-la-Grandville in Cons-la-Grandville
Château de Dieulouard in Dieulouard
Palais des Ducs de Lorraine in Nancy (Palace)
Château d'Euvezin in Euvezin
Château de Fléville in Fléville-devant-Nancy
Château de Gerbéviller in Gerbéviller
Château d'Haroué aka Palais d'Haroué in Haroué (Palace)
 Château d'Hausen in Hombourg-Haut
Château d'Haussonville in Haussonville
Château de Jaillon in Jaillon
Château de Jaulny in Jaulny
Château de Longwy in Longwy, (Ruins) now the Citadelle Vauban
Château de Lunéville in Lunéville (Palace)
Château de Madame de Graffigny in Villers-lès-Nancy
Château de Mailly in Mailly-sur-Seille
Château de Manoncourt in Manoncourt-sur-Seille (Palace)
Château de Montaigu in Laneuveville-devant-Nancy
Château de Morey in Belleau
Château de Mousson in Mousson
Château de Moyen in Moyen
Château de Neuviller-sur-Moselle in Neuviller-sur-Moselle
Château de Nomeny in Nomeny
Château de Pierrefort in Martincourt
Château de Pierre-Percée in Pierre-Percée
Château de Prény in Prény
Château de Pierre-Percée (castle of the Counts of Salm) in Pierre-Percée
Château de Rémicourt in Villers-lès-Nancy
Château de Vaudémont (castle of the Counts of Vaudémont)  in Vaudémont
Château de Vandeléville in Vandeléville (Palace)
Château de Ville-au-Val in Ville-au-Val
Château de la Franche-Moitresse (residence of the architect Emmanuel Héré de Corny) in Eulmont
Château de la Rochotte in Pierre-la-Treiche
Château des comtes de Ludres in Ludres.
Château du Montet in Vandœuvre-lès-Nancy
Maison-forte de Tumejus in Bulligny
Maison-forte de Sexey-aux-Forges in Sexey-aux-Forges
Maison-forte de Villey-Saint-Étienne in Villey-Saint-Étienne

Meuse 

Château Claudot in Beurey-sur-Saulx
Château du Clos in Sampigny
Château de Commercy in Commercy
Château des ducs de Bar in Bar-le-Duc
Château de Fresnois in Montmédy
Château de Gombervaux in Vaucouleurs
Château de Hattonchâtel in Vigneulles-lès-Hattonchâtel
Château de la Malpierre in Rigny-la-Salle
Château de Ligny-en-Barrois in Ligny-en-Barrois
Château de Louppy-sur-Loison in Louppy-sur-Loison
Château de Montbras in Montbras
Château des Monthairons, in Monthairons
Château de Montmédy in Montmédy
Château de Sampigny in Sampigny
Château de Thillombois in Thillombois
Château de la Varenne in Haironville
Château de Vaucouleurs in Vaucouleurs
Château de Ville-sur-Saulx, Ville-sur-Saulx

Moselle 

Château d'Alteville in Tarquimpol
Château d'Ancerville in Ancerville
Château d'Arry in Arry
Château d'Aubigny in Coincy
Château d'Aulnois in Aulnois-sur-Seille
Château de Berg-sur-Moselle in Berg-sur-Moselle
Citadelle de Bitche in Bitche
Château de Blettange in Bousse
Château de Bourg-Esch in Schwerdorff
Château de Burthécourt in Salonnes
Château de Buy in Antilly
Château de Charlesville-sous-bois
Château de Chérisey in Chérisey
Château de Colombey in Coincy
Château de Courcelles in Montigny-lès-Metz
Château de Craincourt in Craincourt
Château des ducs de Lorraine in Sierck-les-Bains
Château des Étangs, Les Étangs
Château Fabert in Moyeuvre
Château du Falkenstein in Philippsbourg
Château de Fénétrange in Fénétrange
Château de Gentersberg in Hanviller
Château du Grand-Arnsberg in Baerenthal
Château de Ramstein in Baerenthal
Château des Hayes in Hayes
Château d'Helfedange in Guinglange
Château de Helfenstein in Philippsbourg
Château de Hellering in Hombourg-Haut
Château d’Henriette de Lorraine in Saint-Avold
Château de Hingsange in Grostenquin
Château du Hohe Weyersberg in Mouterhouse
Château de Hombourg-Budange in Hombourg-Budange
Château de Hombourg-Haut in Hombourg-Haut
Château de La Grange in Manom (Renaissance castle)
Château des Lanzy in Meisenthal
Château de Logne in Rurange-lès-Thionville
Château de Lue in Hayes
Château de Luttange in Luttange
Château de Lutzelbourg in Lutzelbourg
Château de Malbrouck in Manderen
Château de Mardigny in Lorry-Mardigny
Château de Meinsberg in Manderen
Château de Mercy in Ars-Laquenexy
Château de Montoy, à Montoy-Flanville
Château de Moulins-lès-Metz in Moulins-lès-Metz
Château de Mouterhouse in Mouterhouse
Château d'Oriocourt in Oriocourt
Château d'Ottange in Ottange
Château de Pange in Pange
Château de Preiche in Basse-Rentgen
Château de Rahling in Rahling
Château du Ramstein in Baerenthal
Château de Réhicourt in Réhicourt-le-Château
Cité fortifiée de Rodemack in Rodemack
Château de Romécourt in Azoudange
Château de Rothenbourg in Philippsbourg
Château de Roussy-le-Bourg in Roussy-le-Bourg
Château de Rudlingen in Sierck-les-Bains
Château Saint-Oswald in Beckerholz (Filstroff)
Château Saint-Sixte in Freistroff
Château de Sarreck in Oberstinzel
Château du Schlossberg in Forbach
Château de Sierck in Sierck (Ruins)
Château de Sonis in Mouterhouse
Château de Thionville in Thionville
Château de Turquestein in Turquestein-Blancrupt
Château de Vernéville in Vernéville
Château fort de Vry in Vry
Château de Waldeck in Eguelshardt
Château de Woippy in Woippy
Palais abbatial de Gorze in Gorze
Le Hoff in Guentrange (Thionville)

Vosges 

Château d'Autigny in Autigny-la-Tour
Château de Beaufremont in Beaufremont
Château de Bourlémont in Frebécourt
Château de Bruyères in Bruyères
Forteresse de Châtel-sur-Moselle in Châtel-sur-Moselle
Château d'Épinal in Épinal
Château de Failloux in Jeuxey
Château de Fontenoy-le-Château in Fontenoy-le-Château
Château de Girecourt-sur-Durbion in Girecourt-sur-Durbion
Chateau de Lichecourt in Relanges,
Château de Saint-Baslemont in Saint-Baslemont
Château de Saint-Jean-du-Marché in La Neuveville-devant-Lépanges
Château de Thuillières in Thuillières
Château des Brasseurs in Xertigny
Maison-forte de Bulgnéville in Bulgnéville
Versailles vosgien in Saulxures-sur-Moselotte
Châteaux des comtes de Salm-Salm in Senones

Notes and references

See also 
 List of castles in France

Châteaux in Grand Est